Lord Archer may refer to:
Jeffrey Archer, Baron Archer of Weston-super-Mare (born 1940), British author and Conservative politician
Peter Archer, Baron Archer of Sandwell (1926–2012), British lawyer and Labour politician
Holders of the hereditary title of Baron Archer:
Thomas Archer, 1st Baron Archer (1695–1768), British politician, Member of Parliament for Warwick and Bramber
Andrew Archer, 2nd Baron Archer (1736–1778), British politician, Member of Parliament for Coventry